The duPont Registry is an American brand name of print classified advertising publications specializing in luxury automobiles, real estate and yachts. As of 2003, their average reader had a net worth of 2.2 million. The flagship publication is duPont Registry: A Buyers Gallery of Fine Automobiles, which launched in 1985. Other titles include duPont Registry: A Buyers Gallery of Fine Homes, duPont Registry: A Buyers Gallery of Fine Boats, and duPont Registry Tampa Bay. Their web presence has been described as a "rich man's Craigslist".

The original idea was conceived and presented to Thomas L. duPont by Steven B. Chapman and Clinton W. Sly.  Thomas duPont bought one-third of the company and he provided the initial funding.  Chapman, Sly and duPont were equal owners.  Ronald Barreto was the first employee and continues to work at the firm.  The firm's headquarters are in Clearwater, Florida. Their former Tampa location was also home to a luxury car showroom.

References

External links 
 
 

Companies based in St. Petersburg, Florida
Magazine publishing companies of the United States